Machu Such'i Qhuchi or Machu Such'i Q'uchi (a combination of Quechua and Aymara, machu old, such'i a species of pencil catfish, qhuchi or q'uchi wetlands  "old such'i wetlands", Hispanicized spellings Machu Suchi Cuchi, Matchu Suchi Cuchi, Machu Suchi Coochi, Matchu Sochi Conchi) is a mountain in the Apolobamba mountain range in the Bolivian Andes, about 5,679 metres (18,632 ft) high. It is situated near the Peruvian border in the La Paz Department, Franz Tamayo Province, Pelechuco Municipality, east of Such'i Lake.

See also
 Jach'a Waracha
 Cololo Lake
 Wanakuni
List of mountains in the Andes

References 

Mountains of La Paz Department (Bolivia)